Irakli Labadze and Denis Matsukevich were the defending champions.
Kaden Hensel and Adam Hubble won in the final 7–5, 7–5, against Valery Rudnev and Ivan Sergeyev.

Seeds

Draw

Draw

References
 Doubles Draw

Samarkand Challenger - Doubles
Samarkand Challenger